Sky High is a 1922 American silent Western film written and directed by Lynn Reynolds and starring Tom Mix, J. Farrell MacDonald, Eva Novak and Sid Jordan. The action in Sky High takes place in 1922 and while the characters ride horses and fight in saloons, they also use telephones, automobiles and even an aircraft. In 1998, the film was selected for preservation in the United States National Film Registry by the Library of Congress as being "culturally, historically, or aesthetically significant".

Plot

Grant Newbury (Tom Mix), Deputy Inspector of Immigration at the US/Mexico border is asked by his boss to infiltrate a gang smuggling Chinese workers through the border at Calexico, in order to identify and arrest their ringleader. Meanwhile, in Chicago, Estelle Halloway (Eva Novak) is disappointed because her guardian wrote that she would not be able to spend her holidays with him in Calexico as planned. When she wires him that she will come nevertheless with her roommate Marguerite (Adele Warner) and her brother (William Buckley), he tells her that they will meet instead near the Grand Canyon as it is too warm in Calexico.

In Calexico, Grant finds out that the ringleader is none other than Jim Frazer (J. Farrell MacDonald), Estelle's guardian. He becomes part of the gang and is requested to go and help taking of the Chinese now hidden in a camp in Grand Canyon. After having left discreetly the camp to fetch the police, he sees Estelle on the point of drowning in a river and saves her. He is caught by the bandit who have learned that he is a government agent but manages to escape first on horseback then in a motor car and reaches the little town of Williams where he gets the help of the police.

While the police drives to the hidden camp in motor cars, Grant borrows an aircraft and flies into the Grand Canyon where he jumps in a river and manages to free Estelle. Jim Frazer is identified as the ringleader and arrested, but  to protect Estelle, Grant accepts that he lets her believe that he is leaving for a long trip. Frazer asks Grant whether he would help take care of Estelle while he is in jail and Grant answers: "I'll look after her the rest of her life if she'll let me."

Cast

 Tom Mix as Grant Newbury
 J. Farrell MacDonald as Jim Frazer
 Eva Novak as Estelle Halloway - his ward
 Sid Jordan as Andrew Bates
 William Buckley as Victor Castle
 Adele Warner as Marguerite Castle
 Wynn Mace as Henchman Patterson
 Pat Chrisman as Pasquale - Henchman

Production
Principal photography for Sky High took place at the Fox Films studio in Los Angeles and on location at the Grand Canyon National Park, Arizona, Williams, Arizona, and the El Tovar Hotel, Grand Canyon National Park, Arizona. While Tom Mix rarely used doubles, Bud Creeth was hired as a "stunt pilot", flying with Dick Grace to film the dangerous stunt of hanging from a rope over the Grand Canyon.

Reception
In a modern reappraisal of Sky High, reviewer Hans J. Wollstein described the film, "Diehard Western fans decried the lack of realism but audiences flocked to see this film which, more than perhaps any other, changed Mix from a popular Western star into an internationally recognized showman."<ref>Wollstein, Hans J. "Review: 'Sky high'." Allmovie.com', 2019. Retrieved: July 25, 2019.</ref>

See also
 Tom Mix filmography

References
Notes

Citations

Bibliography

 Farmer, James H. Celluloid Wings: The Impact of Movies on Aviation. Blue Ridge Summit, Pennsylvania: Tab Books Inc., 1984. .
 Wynne, H. Hugh. The Motion Picture Stunt Pilots and Hollywood's Classic Aviation Movies''. Missoula, Montana: Pictorial Histories Publishing Co., 1987. .

External links

 
 
 
 

1922 films
1922 Western (genre) films
American aviation films
American black-and-white films
Articles containing video clips
Films about illegal immigration to the United States
Films directed by Lynn Reynolds
Films set in Arizona
Films set in California
Films set in Chicago
Films shot in Arizona
Films shot in Los Angeles
Fox Film films
Silent American Western (genre) films
United States National Film Registry films
1920s English-language films
1920s American films